Partapur is a town in near Meerut city in Meerut district in western Uttar Pradesh, India. 

It is home to the Ambedkar Airstrip, which is proposed by the state government to be converted to an international airport.

References

Cities and towns in Meerut district
Economy of Meerut